The Air Force is the fifth album by Xiu Xiu. It was released on September 12, 2006, and is produced by Greg Saunier of Deerhoof, who also performs on the album with band members Caralee McElroy and Jamie Stewart.

Production 

The album was produced by Greg Saunier of Deerhoof, and released on 5 Rue Christine in September 2006. Stewart said that the year was "one of the first not dominated by personal tragedies" and that the album is about "making other people feel bad" instead of feeling bad oneself. Its major themes are "guilt and sex as opposed to sorrow and sex". Stewart considered it their best and most consciously pop album yet. He said that the band was obsessed with Weezer's Blue Album and The Smiths's The Queen Is Dead while on tour, though the album does not reflect those albums particularly.

Track listing

Notes

 "Feeding the Raging Heart" is the opening song to the 2007 Robby Reis film of the same name.
 "Hello from Eau Claire" and "Saint Pedro Glue Stick" do not have vocals by lead member Jamie Stewart; instead, Caralee McElroy does all of the vocals on the former, while the latter is instrumental.

Personnel

Xiu Xiu
 Jamie Stewart - Production, vocals (1-6, 8-11), percussion (1, 3, 4, 6, 8, 9), drum programming (2-4, 6, 9, 10), synthesizer (2-4, 6, 8, 10), guitar (2, 4, 5, 8, 10), bass (4, 5, 8, 9), sampler (3, 5, 7), harmonica (4, 6), piano (1), accordion (2), recorder (2), autoharp (5), mandolin (9)
 Caralee McElroy - Production, vocals (1, 3, 6, 10), flute (2, 4), synthesizer (4), glockenspiel (9), cymbal (10)

Additional personnel
 Greg Saunier - Production, vocals (1, 3, 5, 6, 10), sampler (2-4, 9, 11), synthesizer (1, 4, 6, 9), guitar (2, 4, 5, 10), percussion (1, 2, 5), piano (1, 8), drum programming (2, 4), bass (3), electronic drums (3), banjo (6), bass drum (6), snare drum (9), glockenspiel (9)
 Devin Hoff - Double bass (2, 10, 11), bass (10)
 David Horvitz - Koto (7)
 Nedelle Torisi - Violin (9)

References

Xiu Xiu albums
2006 albums
5 Rue Christine albums